Sharon Fichman and Anastasia Pavlyuchenkova won the title by defeating Alizé Cornet and Corinna Dentoni 6–2, 6–2 in the final.

Seeds

Draw

Finals

Top half

Bottom half

Sources
Draw

Girls' Doubles
Australian Open, 2006 Girls' Doubles